Taras Hryb (27 March 1952 in Victoria, British Columbia – 25 November 2021 in Salmon Arm, British Columbia) is a Canadian former wrestler who competed in the 1972 Summer Olympics. In the 1974 British Commonwealth Games he finished third in the 82.0 kg. freestyle category. In the 1971 Pan American Games he finished third in the 87.0 kg. freestyle category. Hryb was inducted into the Canadian Wrestling Hall of Fame in 1988 and the Greater Victoria Sports Hall of Fame in 2002.

References

External links
 

1952 births
2021 deaths
Olympic wrestlers of Canada
Wrestlers at the 1972 Summer Olympics
Canadian male sport wrestlers
Canadian people of Ukrainian descent
Wrestlers at the 1974 British Commonwealth Games
Commonwealth Games medallists in wrestling
Commonwealth Games bronze medallists for Canada
Pan American Games medalists in wrestling
Pan American Games bronze medalists for Canada
Sportspeople from Victoria, British Columbia
Wrestlers at the 1971 Pan American Games
Medalists at the 1971 Pan American Games
Medallists at the 1974 British Commonwealth Games